Pásztó is a district in south-eastern part of Nógrád County. Pásztó is also the name of the town where the district seat is found. The district is located in the Northern Hungary Statistical Region.

Geography 
Pásztó District borders with Szécsény District, Salgótarján District and Bátonyterenye District to the north, Gyöngyös District and Hatvan District (Heves County) to the east, Aszód District (Pest County) to the south, Vác District (Pest County) and Balassagyarmat District to the west. The number of the inhabited places in Pásztó District is 26.

Municipalities 
The district has 1 town and 25 villages.
(ordered by population, as of 1 January 2013)

The bolded municipality is the city.

Demographics

In 2011, it had a population of 31,729 and the population density was 58/km².

Ethnicity
Besides the Hungarian majority, the main minorities are the Roma (approx. 3,000), Slovak (650) and German (100).

Total population (2011 census): 31,729
Ethnic groups (2011 census): Identified themselves: 31,532 persons:
Hungarians: 27,673 (87.76%)
Gypsies: 2,874 (9.11%)
Slovaks: 630 (2.00%)
Others and indefinable: 355 (1.13%)
Approx. 200 persons in Pásztó District did not declare their ethnic group at the 2011 census.

Religion
Religious adherence in the county according to 2011 census:

Catholic – 18,594 (Roman Catholic – 18,513; Greek Catholic – 79);
Evangelical – 2,014; 
Reformed – 467; 
other religions – 620; 
Non-religious – 2,731; 
Atheism – 212;
Undeclared – 7,091.

Gallery

See also
List of cities and towns of Hungary

References

External links
 Postal codes of the Pásztó District

Districts in Nógrád County